Scott Robert Coolbaugh (born June 13, 1966) is an American former Major League Baseball (MLB) third baseman who played for the Texas Rangers, San Diego Padres, and St. Louis Cardinals between 1989 and 1994. He is the hitting coach for the San Diego Padres.

Career

Playing career
Coolbaugh attended Theodore Roosevelt High School and the University of Texas-Austin. In 1985 and 1986, he played collegiate summer baseball with the Chatham A's of the Cape Cod Baseball League and was named a league all-star both seasons. He was selected by the Texas Rangers in the third round of the 1987 MLB Draft.

Coaching career
In 1999, Coolbaugh played for the Triple-A Tucson Sidewinders and also was a player–coach for Double-A El Paso. In , he was again the hitting coach for El Paso. Coolbaugh served as El Paso's manager from –. From –, he was the hitting coach for Double-A Frisco in the Rangers' organization. On December 29, 2008, he was named the hitting coach for the Triple-A Oklahoma City RedHawks. On June 8, 2011, the Texas Rangers brought him in from their Triple-A affiliate, Round Rock, to replace hitting coach Thad Bosley.

On October 19, 2012, Coolbaugh was replaced as hitting coach by Dave Magadan. He was offered another job within the organization. Coolbaugh served as hitting coach for the Baltimore Orioles from 2015 through 2018. He then served as hitting coach for the Oklahoma City Dodgers in 2019. Coolbaugh was hired by the Chicago White Sox as their assistant hitting coach prior to the 2020 season. 

On November 7, 2020, Coolbaugh was named hitting coach for the Detroit Tigers, a position he served in until being dismissed following the 2022 season.

Personal
Coolbaugh is the brother of the late major league player and minor league coach Mike Coolbaugh, who was killed after being struck by a line drive while serving as the first base coach for the Tulsa Drillers.

References

External links

Career statistics and player information from Korea Baseball Organization

1966 births
Living people
American expatriate baseball players in Canada
American expatriate baseball players in Japan
American expatriate baseball players in South Korea
Baltimore Orioles coaches
Baseball players from New York (state)
Birmingham Barons players
Charlotte Rangers players
Chatham Anglers players
Chicago White Sox coaches
Detroit Tigers coaches
El Paso Diablos players
Hanshin Tigers players
Hyundai Unicorns players
KBO League infielders
Las Vegas Stars (baseball) players
Louisville Redbirds players
Major League Baseball hitting coaches
Major League Baseball third basemen
Minor league baseball coaches
Nashville Sounds players
Nippon Professional Baseball first basemen
Nippon Professional Baseball third basemen
Oklahoma City 89ers players
Ottawa Lynx players
Rochester Red Wings players
St. Louis Cardinals players
San Diego Padres players
Sportspeople from Binghamton, New York
Texas Longhorns baseball players
Texas Rangers coaches
Texas Rangers players
Tucson Sidewinders players
Tulsa Drillers players